This list of fictional dogs is subsidiary to the list of fictional animals. It is restricted to notable dog characters from the world of fiction. For real/famous dogs, see List of dogs. For mythological dogs, see Mythological dogs.

Literature

Prose and poetry

 Buck, in Jack London's The Call of the Wild
 Bull's-eye, Bill Sikes' dog in Oliver Twist by Charles Dickens
 Ripper, Marjorie Dursley's pet dog in J.K Rowling's Harry Potter and the Prisoner of Azkaban
 Jip (short for Gypsy), Dora Spenlow's spaniel in Charles Dickens' David Copperfield
 Jip, resident in the household of Hugh Lofting's Dr. Dolittle
 Baleia, the dog-companion that follows a poor family throughout the hardships of the 1915-drought in Brazil in Vidas secas, by Graciliano Ramos
 Quincas Borba, the dog whose name is the same as his human's in Machado de Assis' Quincas Borba
 Tentação, the dog in the homonymous short-story by Clarice Lispector
 Pingo de Ouro, Miguilim's companion in the novella Campo Geral, by João Guimarães Rosa
 Biruta, the dog in the homonymous short-story by Lygia Fagundes Telles
 Bruno Lichtenstein, the dog in the homonymous short-story by Rubem Braga
 Toto, Dorothy's dog in The Wizard of Oz, by L. Frank Baum
 Sharik, the astray dog who undergoes a transformation surgery in Heart of a Dog, by Mikhail Bulgakov
 Mr. Bones, the companion dog in Timbuktu, by Paul Auster
 Randolph, a Labrador retriever and the narrator of A Dog About Town, by JF Englert

Comics

Media

Film (live-action)

Television (live-action)

Film (animation)

Television (animation)

Animation

Song
Only songs with dog characters are included in this section. Not metaphorical dogs or songs with "dog" in the title.
 Apollo, from various Coheed & Cambria songs, whose name appears in the titles of their third and fourth albums
 Arrow, from Harry Nilsson's single "Me and My Arrow", also featured in The Point!
 "Atomic Dog" by George Clinton
 "Bingo", from the spelling song of the same name. It's worth noting that the lyrics do not make it clear whether Bingo is the name of the dog or the farmer.
 "Black Shuck", song by The Darkness about the spectral black dog, Black Shuck
 Blue, from the song of the same name by Peter, Paul and Mary
 Boo, from "Me and You and a Dog Named Boo", 1971 song by Lobo (aka Roland Kent Lavoie)
 "Bow Wow Wow Wow (Wild Dog on the Prowl)" sung by Mitch Ryder with Was (Not Was)
 Carlos, "A little chihuahua ... that had some kind of skin disease and was totally blind" in the song "Frank's Wild Years" by Tom Waits.
 Catalessi, "Torna Catalessi" by Caparezza
 "Death of a Martian", Red Hot Chili Peppers song about the death of Flea's dog Martian, from the 2006 album "Stadium Arcadium".
 "Evelyn, A Modified Dog", from the eponymous song on Frank Zappa's "One Size Fits All" (1975).
 "Feed Jake", song about a dog named Jake by Pirates of the Mississippi
 Fido, talking dog from the Frank Zappa song "Stinkfoot" from his album Over-Nite Sensation (1973).
 Frank, in "Classified" by C. W. McCall
 Frunobulax, a large poodle, appears on the Frank Zappa and the Mothers album '"Roxy and Elsewhere" (1973).
 "Gonna Buy Me a Dog", by The Monkees
 "(How Much Is) That Doggie in the Window?", popular song by Bob Merrill, 1953, recorded by Patti Page
 "I Love My Dog", by Cat Stevens
 Jack, Crazy Chester's dog in "The Weight" by The Band
 "Martha My Dear" by the Beatles (Paul McCartney's sheepdog)
 "Old King" by Neil Young
 "Ol' Red", prison dog from the song of the same name, recorded by George Jones, Kenny Rogers and Blake Shelton
 "Old Shep" by Red Foley as also sung by Elvis Presley and many other country performers
 "Old Tige", by Jim Reeves
 Quiche Lorraine, two-inch tall green poodle, from a song of the same name by The B-52's from the album "Wild Planet"
 "Seamus", in song by same name (from "Meddle") by Pink Floyd
 "Where, O Where Has My Little Dog Gone?" by Septimus Winner
 "Shannon", from the Henry Gross song of that name, inspired by Gross's and Carl Wilson's Irish Setters, both named Shannon
 Sinatra, dog named after the singer for its blue eyes in the 2002 song "Sinatra" by Canadian folk singer James Keelaghan
 Strider, Merle dog in "Over the Hills and Far Away" by Led Zeppelin
 The dog who "up and died" in "Mr. Bojangles", written by Jerry Jeff Walker
 Stubb, from the song "Stubb (A Dub)" by Mr. Bungle
 A dog that won't get off the furniture in "Get Down" by Gilbert O'Sullivan
 "The Puppy song" by Harry Nilsson
 "The Nudist & Mr. Pendleton" by fictional band The Lavender Fudge Experience (from the TV series "Whatever Happened to Robot Jones?)
 Queenie, dog who was shot and killed in "Queenie's Song" by Guy Clark (co-written with Terry Allen), 2002
 “My Only Man of the Hour” by Norah Jones

Video games

Sporting and advertising mascots
 Axelrod, in advertisements for Flying A Service Stations
 Big Mo for Alpo dog food
 Boo, The Citadel, named after Lt. Col. Thomas Nugent Courvoisie, known by most as "The Boo".  In 2013 they introduced Boo X
 Brutus, mascot for the Canterbury Bankstown Bulldogs
 Bullseye, bull terrier mascot of Target Corporation
 Colin Curly, bulldog mascot for Quavers. Voice by Lenny Henry
 Cobi, Catalan sheepdog as the mascot for the 1992 Summer Olympics
 Dinky, chihuahua for Taco Bell fast food restaurant
 Dubs, mascot of the Washington Huskies
 Duke, in advertisements for Bush Baked Beans
 General The Citadel introduced 2003, in 2013 introduced General II aka G2
 Farfel the Dog, in advertisements for Nestle Quick chocolate
 Handsome Dan, mascot of the Yale Bulldogs
 Jack the Bulldog, mascot of the Georgetown Hoyas
 Jason, in advertisements for Hush Puppies
 Johnathan, mascot of the UConn Huskies
 Lady Greyhound, mascot of the Greyhound Lines Bus Company
 McGruff the Crime Dog, for the National Crime Prevention Council
 Moondog, mascot of the NBA, Cleveland Cavaliers
 Nipper, in advertisements for RCA
 Reveille, mascot of Texas A&M University
 Rhett, mascot of the Boston University Terriers
 Rocket, cartoon canine in Life is Good Company advertisements
 Striker, mascot of the 1994 FIFA World Cup
 Smokey, mascot of the Tennessee Volunteers
 Sparky, fire dog icon for National Fire Protection Association
 Spuds MacKenzie, Budweiser beer mascot
 Uga, mascot of Georgia Bulldogs
 Walkie Talkie, the dog of Bazooka Joe
 Woofer Dog Whitten, mascot of the Western Bulldogs

Other fictional dogs
 Boggins in the radio show Adam and Joe on BBC 6 Music, 2009, voiced by Adam Buxton.* Fairfield Industrial Dog Object, FIDO, very large moving dog sculpture in Australia
 "Froofie the Dog", fictional cartoon dog from a Bill Cosby monologue of the same name from Inside the Mind of Bill Cosby Power Pup, superhero dog from the Microsoft Office Assistant
 FidoNet logo
 Dog on the Tuckerbox, allegorical dog depicted at an historical monument in New South Wales, Australia
 Jasper T. Jowls, a bloodhound and one of the characters from the pizza chain Chuck E. Cheese's
 Lapák the dachshund in Leoš Janáček's opera The Cunning Little Vixen'' 
Hairy Maclary from Donaldson's Dairy, the protagonist in an eponymous story book.

See also
 List of famous dogs
 List of fictional canines
 List of robotic dogs
 Dogs Playing Poker
 List of fictional cats and other felines
 :Category:Films about dogs
 Dogs portal

References

Further reading

Sources
  Some of the prose in this article was copied from http://www.lingerandlook.com/Names/DogsallList.php and related pages, which are available under the Creative Commons Attribution-Share Alike 3.0 Unported license and the GNU Free Documentation License.

 
Fictional
Dogs